United Nations Security Council resolution 777, adopted unanimously on 19 September 1992, after reaffirming Resolution 713 (1992) and all subsequent resolutions on the topic, the Council considered that, as the state known as the Socialist Federal Republic of Yugoslavia (SFRY) had ceased to exist, it noted that under Resolution 757 (1992), the claim by the Federal Republic of Yugoslavia (Serbia and Montenegro) to continue automatic membership in the United Nations was not widely accepted and so determined that membership of the SFRY in the United Nations could not continue. Therefore, the Council recommended to the General Assembly that the Federal Republic of Yugoslavia (Serbia and Montenegro) ceased participation in the General Assembly and apply for membership in the United Nations.

The original draft resolution, by the United States, stated that the General Assembly confirmed that "Yugoslavia's membership in the United Nations be extinguished", however this was removed in order to obtain Russian support and the resolution itself remained open to interpretation. Russia and China had rejected the idea that the Federal Republic of Yugoslavia be excluded from all United Nations organs, saying that its work in the other organs would be unaffected. Meanwhile, India and Zimbabwe (traditional allies of Yugoslavia via the Non-Aligned Movement) said that Resolution 777 violated the United Nations Charter, in particular Articles 5 and 6.

The resolution, which also stated that it would consider the matter before the end of the 47th session of the General Assembly, was adopted by 12 votes to none against, while China, India and Zimbabwe abstained from voting.

On 22 September 1992, the General Assembly approved, by a majority of 127 votes in favour, 6 votes against and 26 abstentions, the decision of the Security Council in Resolution 47/1, though the text was weakened with the removal of "considering that the state formerly known as the Socialist Federal Republic of Yugoslavia has ceased to exist." From 1992 to 2000, the Federal Republic of Yugoslavia declined to re-apply for membership in the United Nations and the United Nations Secretariat allowed the mission from the SFRY to continue to operate and accredited representatives of the Federal Republic of Yugoslavia to the SFRY mission, continuing work in various United Nations organs.

See also
 Breakup of Yugoslavia
 List of United Nations Security Council Resolutions 701 to 800 (1991–1993)
 Succession of states
 Yugoslav Wars

References

External links
 
 Text of the Resolution at undocs.org

 0777
 0777
1992 in Yugoslavia
 0777
September 1992 events